Anders Wikström  (born 14 December 1981) is a former Swedish footballer who played as a defender.

External links

1981 births
Living people
Swedish footballers
Association football defenders
Gefle IF players
IF Elfsborg players